Christopher J. Kraus (born 1963) is a German author and film director.

Life and work

Kraus was born in 1963 in Göttingen. He worked as a screenwriter before he staged his love duel Shattered Glass (Scherbentanz) into a feature film in 2002. His second work as a director Four Minutes (Vier Minuten), a drama, won national and international awards. Kraus' third feature film, The Poll Diaries, received four golden "Lolas," three Bavarian Film Awards, one Bambi and the German Film Critic's Award. Kraus shot the film Pink Children (2012) together with four German directors about their mentor Rosa von Praunheim. This was followed by his film The Bloom of Yesterday, a winner at the Tokyo International Film Festival, at the Jewish Film Festival Moscow, of the Baden-Württemberg Film Prize and of the Thomas-Strittmatter Prize for Best Screenplay. In total, this comedy featuring Lars Eidinger and Adèle Haenel was nominated in eight categories for the German Film Prize and in three categories for the Austrian Film Prize.

Awards 
2002: Bavarian Film Award, Best New Director (Shattered Glass)
2002: German Film Advancement Award, Screenplay (Shattered Glass)
2003: New Faces Award, Best Director (Shattered Glass)
2006: Bavarian Film Award, Best Screenplay
2007: German Film Prize, Best Film (Four Minutes)
2007: Sofia International Film Festival, Best Director (Four Minutes)
2010: Black Nights Tallinn Film Festival: Best Director (The Poll Diaries)

Filmography
 1999: The Einstein of Sex
 2000: Lovebabe
 2002: 
 2004: 
 2004: Acapulco
 2006: Four Minutes
 2008: Bella Block: Trip to China (TV film)
 2010: The Poll Diaries
 2012: Pink Children
 2016: The Bloom of Yesterday

Publications

References

External links

 His Agent Page with a current photograph

1963 births
Living people
Film people from Lower Saxony
Mass media people from Göttingen